Hoseynabad (also Romanized as Ḩoseynābād) is a village in Estakhr-e Posht Rural District, Hezarjarib District, Neka County, Mazandaran Province, Iran. At the 2006 census, its population was 88, in 18 families.

References 

Populated places in Neka County